Clement S. Coward Jr. is a United States Army major general who has served as the Director of the Sexual Assault Prevention and Response Office of the Office of the Under Secretary of Defense for Personnel and Readiness since September 2020. Previously, he served as the Commanding General of the 32nd Army Air and Missile Defense Command from November 2018 to August 2020. Raised in Fayetteville, North Carolina, Coward earned a Bachelor of Arts degree in speech communications from the University of North Carolina at Wilmington in 1989. He later received a Master of Arts degree in national security and strategic studies from the Naval War College and a Master of Science degree in strategic studies from the United States Army War College.

He is scheduled to retire from active duty.

References

Year of birth missing (living people)
Living people
Place of birth missing (living people)
People from Fayetteville, North Carolina
University of North Carolina at Wilmington alumni
African-American United States Army personnel
Naval War College alumni
United States Army War College alumni
Recipients of the Legion of Merit
United States Army generals
Recipients of the Defense Superior Service Medal
Recipients of the Distinguished Service Medal (US Army)
21st-century African-American people